Claude-Louis-François Régnier, comte de Guerchy, later marquis de Blosset (1715–1767) was a French diplomat.

See also 
 List of Ambassadors of France to the United Kingdom

External links 
 www.heraldique-europeenne.org

1715 births
1767 deaths
18th-century French diplomats
People from Burgundy (French region)
French marquesses
Ambassadors of France to Great Britain